In the Government of the United Kingdom, the Parliamentary Under-Secretary of State for Arts and Heritage is a ministerial post in the Department for Culture, Media and Sport. 

The post is usually a junior to middle-ranking minister to the more senior Secretary of State, who runs the entire department and is ultimately responsible for the department's brief.

The post has been in a variety of ministries, but after 1997 it has been a Minister of State position in the Department for Culture, Media and Sport. From 1992 to 1997, the post was combined with the office of Secretary of State for National Heritage. The title of the post was changed to Minister for Culture in 2005, and to Minister for Culture, Creative Industries and Tourism in 2007. Under that last title, the office was held by Barbara Follett MP, who was appointed on 5 October 2008, until 22 September 2009.

Ed Vaizey was appointed by then Prime Minister David Cameron to the position as Minister for Culture, Communications and Creative Industries at Parliamentary Under-Secretary of State level, a post Vaizey initially split between the Department for Culture, Media and Sport (DCMS) and the Department for Business, Innovation and Skills (BIS), but is now entirely placed in the DCMS.

Current portfolio
Arts and museums
Ceremonials
DCMS business in the Lords

Ministers for the Arts 
The individuals who have held the office of Minister for the Arts or equivalent existing positions, their terms and under which Prime Minister.

References

External links
 UK Government document listing past Ministers for the Arts, DCMS (PDF).

Arts
Arts in the United Kingdom
Department for Digital, Culture, Media and Sport
1964 establishments in the United Kingdom
Industry in the United Kingdom